Love Is All We Have to Give is the first studio album by Checkmates, Ltd., released in 1969, and their second overall album after the 1967 live album Live! at Caesar's Palace. Love Is All We Have to Give reached No. 178 on the Billboard Top LPs chart.

The album featured four singles: "Black Pearl", which reached No. 8 on the R&B chart and No. 13 on the Billboard Hot 100, "Proud Mary", which reached No. 69 on the Billboard Hot 100, "Love Is All I Have to Give" which reached No. 65 on the Hot 100, and "I Keep Forgettin'" which did not chart on the pop chart.

Track listing
 "Proud Mary" (John Fogerty) – 4:30
 "Spanish Harlem" (Jerry Leiber, Mike Stoller, Phil Spector) – 3:17
 "Black Pearl" (Phil Spector, Toni Wine, Irwin Levine) – 3:25
 "I Keep Forgettin'" (Jerry Leiber, Mike Stoller) – 3:03
 "Love Is All I Have to Give" (Bobby Stevens, Phil Spector) – 4:13
 The Hair Anthology Suite: "Ain't Got No/I Got Life/Prelude/Theme/Postlude/Let The Sunshine (Overture)/Prelude/Aquarius/Prelude/Theme/Let The Sunshine In/Ain't Got No (Finale)/Prelude/Postlude" (James Rado, Gerome Ragni, Galt MacDermot) – 20:00

Personnel
Phil Spector - producer
Perry Botkin Jr. (Tracks 1-5), Dee Barton (Track 1, 2, 4, 6) - arrangements and conductor
Sonny Charles (Tracks 1-4, 6), Bobby Stevens (Tracks 5-6) - lead vocals
Harvey Trees - lead guitar
Bill Van Buskirk - electric bass
Marvin "Sweet Louie" Smith - drums

Charts

Singles

References

1969 albums
Checkmates, Ltd. albums
Albums produced by Phil Spector
A&M Records albums